Gerlinger is a surname. Notable people with the surname include:

Carl Gerlinger, businessperson in the U.S. state of Oregon, nephew of George Gerlinger
Christoph Gerlinger, German internet entrepreneur and venture capitalist
George T. Gerlinger, lumber and railroad businessperson in Oregon, son of Louis Gerlinger
Irene Hazard Gerlinger, first female regent of the University of Oregon, wife of George Gerlinger
Louis Gerlinger, Sr., lumber and railroad businessperson in Oregon

See also
Gerlinger Hall on the University of Oregon campus